James Wallbanks (12 September 1909 – 28 October 1979) was an English professional footballer who played as a half back and right back in the Football League for Millwall, Reading, Barnsley, Norwich City and Northampton Town. After retiring as a player, he served Reading as trainer and physiotherapist for 22 years and took caretaker charge of the club in 1971.

Personal life 
Wallbanks' brothers Fred, John, Horace and Harry also became footballers.

Honours 
Reading Hall of Fame

References

English Football League players
Reading F.C. players
Association football fullbacks

English footballers
Reading F.C. managers
English Football League managers
Association football wing halves
1909 births
1979 deaths
Footballers from Wigan
Annfield Plain F.C. players
Barnsley F.C. players
Norwich City F.C. players
Northampton Town F.C. players
Wigan Athletic F.C. players
Millwall F.C. players
Ramsgate F.C. players
Ramsgate F.C. managers